is a private university at Machida, Tokyo, Japan. The predecessor, Showa Women's Pharmaceutical Junior College, was founded in 1930, and it was chartered as a university in 1949.

History
The university was originally founded as the Showa Women's Pharmaceutical Junior College in 1930, and became the Showa Women's College of Pharmaceutical Sciences in 1949. In 1950, co-ed education began, and the college was accordingly renamed as the Showa College of Pharmaceutical Sciences.

Construction of a new campus in Machida began in 1985. The university relocated there in 1990.

Alumni 
 Wakio Mitsui – politician

References

External links
 Official website

Educational institutions established in 1930
Private universities and colleges in Japan
Universities and colleges in Tokyo
1930 establishments in Japan